María de las Mercedes of Orléans (24 June 1860 – 26 June 1878) was Queen of Spain as the first wife of King Alfonso XII. She was born in Madrid, the daughter of Antoine of Orléans, Duke of Montpensier, and Infanta Luisa Fernanda of Spain.

Early life
 
Born at the Palacio Real in Madrid on 24 June 1860, Mercedes was the sixth of her parents' nine children. Her father, Antoine, was the Duke of Montpensier while her mother, Luisa Fernanda, was an Infanta of Spain. Her mother's elder sister, Queen Isabella II, and brother-in-law, King Francis, served as Mercedes' godparents at her christening, when she was given the names: María de las Mercedes Isabel Francisca de Asís Antonia Luisa Fernanda Felipa Amalia Cristina Francisca de Paula Ramona Rita Cayetana Manuela Juana Josefa Joaquina Ana Rafaela Filomena Teresa Santísima Trinidad Gaspara Melchora Baltasara et omni sancti.

Although Mercedes was patrilineally a French princess, she was also a Spanish infanta and spent the first eight years of her life in Spain. Her childhood was spent at the Palace of San Telmo in Andalusia, her father's rumoured aspirations to obtain his sister-in-law's crown periodically rendering him unwelcome at the royal court in Madrid.

Marriage and reign
When Queen Isabella II was deposed in 1868, Mercedes' family left Spain for exile. It was reportedly during that banishment in 1872 that she met her first cousin Alfonso, Prince of Asturias, also living in exile. Isabella II opposed a marriage between the two due to the hostilities between Mercedes' father and the former queen.

Upon restoration, King Alfonso married María de las Mercedes at the church of Atocha in Madrid on 23 January 1878, following a huge ball in December 1877. Allegedly, the King's choice dashed the hopes of his still-exiled mother Queen Isabella for Alfonso's marriage to Infanta Blanca de Borbón, daughter of his Carlist rival Carlos, Duke of Madrid.

Mercedes helped build a new temple after the Church of Santa María de la Almudena was demolished in 1868.

Death

Shortly after their honeymoon, it became evident that Queen Mercedes suffered from typhoid fever. The marriage would last only six months, during which she reportedly had a miscarriage. She died due to the fever on 26 June 1878, at 18 years old.

Legacy
The news of her demise spawned many folk songs accounting for it, most notably the famous copla, with many variations in Spain and America, particularly popular among children delivered as a song accompanying a skipping rope game. According to Benito Pérez Galdós, he had already heard about it few days after the incident: “¿Dónde vas Alfonso XII? ¿Dónde vas triste de ti? Voy en busca de Mercedes que ayer tarde no la vi…” ("Where are you going, Alfonso XII? Where are you going, sad man?—I'm going in search of Mercedes whom I did not see yesterday afternoon..."). A film about the romance between María de las Mercedes and Alfonso XII, Where Are You Going, Alfonso XII?, was released in 1958.

Queen Mercedes co-initiated the building of the Cathedral of la Almudena in Madrid, opposite of the royal palace —the construction beginning in 1883. In May 2004 Felipe, Prince of Asturias, was wed there to Letizia Ortiz. Queen Mercedes' remains were re-interred there on 8 November 2000, in accordance with her widower's wishes.

A town in the northern Philippine province of Isabela was named Reina Mercedes in her honor in 1886 when the Spanish colonial government formally separated it from Cauayan.

When the King's minister Cánovas del Castillo suggested that he take a new wife, Alfonso acquiesced, choosing Mercedes' sister María Cristina. She also contracted tuberculosis, and died during the engagement period. In late 1879, he married Archduchess Maria Christina of Austria-Teschen; the eldest of their children, the Princess of Asturias, was named in honour of Queen Mercedes.

Ancestry

References

External links

1860 births
1878 deaths
19th-century Spanish people
Deaths from typhus
House of Bourbon (Spain)
House of Orléans-Galliera
Infectious disease deaths in Spain
Nobility from Madrid
Princesses of France (Orléans)
Spanish royal consorts
Alfonso XII of Spain
Royal reburials